Sebastián Matías Giovini (born 28 February 1990) is an Argentine professional footballer who plays as a goalkeeper for Defensores de Belgrano.

Career
Giovini's first senior team was Argentinos Juniors. He was moved into the club's squad for the 2011–12 Primera División season, appearing on the substitutes bench fourteen times but didn't feature as they qualified for the 2012 Copa Sudamericana. His debut arrived in March 2013 against Sportivo Belgrano in the Copa Argentina, with the Torneo Argentino A team eliminating Argentinos Juniors. Giovini had to wait two years for his first league match, with it coming on 18 October 2015 versus Rosario Central. In January 2016, Giovini was loaned to Primera B Metropolitana's Comunicaciones. Forty-two games followed.

On 23 August 2017, Giovini joined Primera B Nacional side Guillermo Brown on loan. Having been an unused substitute for the rest of 2017, a 1–3 loss at home to Atlético de Rafaela in February 2018 saw Giovini participate in his first fixture for the club. He terminated his contract with Argentinos Juniors at the conclusion of 2017–18, subsequently returning to Guillermo Brown on a free transfer.

On 28 June 2019 it was confirmed, that Giovini had joined Defensores de Belgrano.

Career statistics
.

References

External links

1990 births
Living people
Sportspeople from Córdoba Province, Argentina
Argentine footballers
Association football goalkeepers
Argentine Primera División players
Primera B Metropolitana players
Primera Nacional players
Argentinos Juniors footballers
Club Comunicaciones footballers
Guillermo Brown footballers
Defensores de Belgrano footballers